Chromosome 15 open reading frame 48 is a protein that in humans is encoded by the C15orf48 gene.

Function

This gene was first identified in a study of human esophageal squamous cell carcinoma tissues. Levels of both the message and protein are reduced in carcinoma samples. In adult human tissues, this gene is expressed in the esophagus, stomach, small intestine, colon and placenta. Alternatively spliced transcript variants that encode the same protein have been identified.

References

Further reading